Supramolecular electronics is the experimental field of supramolecular chemistry that bridges the gap between molecular electronics and bulk plastics in the construction of electronic circuitry at the nanoscale 1. In supramolecular electronics, assemblies of pi-conjugated systems on the 5 to 100 nanometer length scale are prepared by molecular self-assembly with the aim to fit these structures between electrodes. With single-molecules as researched in molecular electronics at the 5 nanometer scale this would be impractical. Nanofibers can be prepared from polymers such as polyaniline and polyacetylene 12. Chiral oligo(p-phenylenevinylene)s self-assemble in a controlled fashion into (helical) wires 3. An example of actively researched compounds in this field are certain coronenes.

References 
 1 Chemistry: Material marriage in electronics E. W. Meijer, Albert P. H. J. Schenning Nature 419, 353-354 (26 Sep 2002) 
 2 Supramolecular electronics; nanowires from self-assembled -conjugated systems A. P. H. J. Schenning and E. W. Meijer Chemical Communications, 2005, (26), 3245 - 3258 Abstract
 3 Towards supramolecular electronics A.P.H.J. Schenning et al. Synthetic Metals 147 (2004) 43–48 Article

Electronics
Molecular electronics
Nanoelectronics